Minnie Tate (1857 – April 29, 1899) was the youngest original member of the Fisk Jubilee Singers, based in Nashville, Tennessee.

Early life
Tate was born in Nashville, Tennessee, the daughter of Andrew L. Tate and Adelle A. Livingston Tate. Her grandmother, Dicey Tanner, and mother, Adelle, were freed from enslavement in Mississippi, and migrated north. Tate's mother was a teacher. Tate enrolled at Fisk University.

Career
Tate and Eliza Walker were the youngest members of the Fisk Jubilee Singers when it first formed in 1871; both were fourteen years old that year. Tate's "sweet, clear voice" was showcased in the song "Flee as a Bird" in their performances.  The Fisk Jubilee Singers performed African-American spirituals. They also sang songs by white composer Stephen Foster. Their performances raised money for Fisk, and eventually paid for Jubilee Hall on the Nashville campus. She was the youngest of the group when they toured Great Britain, Holland, and Germany, singing for Queen Victoria, William Ewart Gladstone, Dwight L. Moody, Mark Twain, Henry Ward Beecher, Ulysses S. Grant, and others.

The physical strain of that tour made Minnie Tate give up professional singing upon her return to the United States. In 1880, she and fellow Jubilee Singer Georgia Gordon sang a duet at an event marking the ninth anniversary of the group's formation.

Personal life
Tate married a fellow singer, R. A. Hall; they had a son, Roger. She was widowed in 1886. She died in 1899, in her early forties, in Nashville. In 1978, Tate and the other original members of the Fisk Jubilee Singers were granted posthumous honorary Doctor of Music degrees from Fisk University. It is traditional for current Fisk Jubilee Singers to sing and place a wreath of magnolia leaves at the Nashville grave of Minnie Tate every year.

References

External links
 
 A stereograph portrait of Minnie Tate, from the Schomberg Center for Research in Black Culture, New York Public Library Digital Collections.
 An illustration of Minnie Tate, from Gustavus D. Pike, Jubilee Singers and their Campaign for Twenty Thousand Dollars (1873).

1857 births
1899 deaths
American women singers
Fisk University alumni
People from Nashville, Tennessee
Singers from Tennessee
Burials in Tennessee
19th-century American women musicians